Jalan Seri Kembangan, or Jalan Putra Permai and Jalan Besar, Federal Route 3215 (formerly Selangor state route B16), is a major highway in Selangor, Malaysia. This 9.4 km (5.8 miles) toll-free highway connects Serdang interchange of the Damansara–Puchong Expressway in the southwest to Seri Kembangan interchange of the Besraya Expressway in the northeast. Jalan Seri Kembangan connects with three major tolled expressways: Damansara–Puchong Expressway, Maju Expressway and Besraya Expressway.

The Kilometre Zero is located at Serdang interchange of the Damansara–Puchong Expressway.

At most sections, the Federal Route 3215 was built under the JKR R5 road standard, with a speed limit of 90 km/h.

List of junctions

References

Highways in Malaysia
Malaysian Federal Roads